This page is a list of final matches of the All-Ireland Senior Camogie Championship, the premier inter-county competition in camogie.

References

Notes

 
Camogie